Gowdy is a surname. Notable people with the surname include:

Barbara Gowdy (born 1950), Canadian novelist and short story writer
Bill Gowdy (1903–1958), Irish association football player
Bruce Gowdy, American guitarist
 Cornell Gowdy (born 1963), American football player
Curt Gowdy (1919–2006), American sportscaster 
Hank Gowdy (1889–1966), American baseball player
Joe Gowdy (fl. 1920s), Irish association football player
John W. Gowdy (1869–1963), Scottish American Bishop of the Methodist Episcopal Church and The Methodist Church
Pete Gowdy, British singer-songwriter
Trey Gowdy (born 1964), American attorney and former U.S. Representative from South Carolina

See also
Gowdy, Indiana, a community in the United States
Karen Morris-Gowdy (born 1956), American actress
Gowdy solution
Gowdy Field, former athletic field in Columbus, Ohio
Curt Gowdy Media Award, an annual award given by the Basketball Hall of Fame to outstanding basketball writers and broadcasters
Curt Gowdy State Park, state park located in Wyoming